Nimavar school is a historical school in Isfahan, Iran. It's located in Nimavar Bazaar and belongs to Safavid era. This school was built in 1691 in the era of Suleiman I.

References 

Buildings and structures completed in 1691
School buildings completed in the 17th century
Buildings and structures in Isfahan
1691 establishments in Iran